Albano Eduardo Harguindeguy (11 February 1927 – 29 October 2012) was a general of the Argentine Army, and the interior minister of Argentina under dictator Jorge Rafael Videla, during the National Reorganization Process (1976–1983).

Harguindeguy, allegedly involved in human rights abuses, benefitted from the pardon of President Carlos Menem in 1989, along with other members of the dictatorship. In 2004 he refused to testify before a judge investigating illegal detentions and killings under Operation Condor, and he was put under house arrest. In 2006, another judge struck down Harguindeguy's pardon, along with that of Videla and of fellow minister José Alfredo Martínez de Hoz, as unconstitutional.

He died on 29 October 2012 at age 85, while under house arrest.

References

1927 births
2012 deaths
Argentine generals
Operatives of the Dirty War
Recipients of Argentine presidential pardons
Place of birth missing 
Place of death missing
Ministers of Internal Affairs of Argentina